The Haukar women's football team is the women's football department of the Haukar multi-sport club. It is based in Hafnarfjörður, Iceland, and currently plays in the 1. deild kvenna, the second-tier women's football league in Iceland, after being relegated from Úrvalsdeild kvenna in 2017.

Trophies
1. deild kvenna
Winner: 1985, 1996, 2009, 2016

References

External links
 Haukar Football Official Website
 2018 Club profile at ksi.is

Haukar
Capital Region (Iceland)
Úrvalsdeild Women clubs